Rüdiger Hübbers-Lüking (born 3 September 1965, in St. Tönis) is a German slalom canoeist who competed in the 1990s. He won a bronze medal in the C-2 team event at the 1995 ICF Canoe Slalom World Championships in Nottingham. He also won a gold medal in the same event at the 1996 European Championships in Augsburg.

He finished 14th in the C-2 event at the 1992 Summer Olympics in Barcelona.

His partner throughout the whole of his active career was Udo Raumann.

References
Sports-Reference.com profile

1965 births
Canoeists at the 1992 Summer Olympics
German male canoeists
Living people
Olympic canoeists of Germany
Place of birth missing (living people)
Medalists at the ICF Canoe Slalom World Championships
People from Viersen (district)
Sportspeople from Düsseldorf (region)